Pashaki or Pashki, also rendered as Pashakh, may refer to:
 Bala Mahalleh-ye Pashaki
 Pain Mahalleh-ye Pashaki